Sophie Troiano (born 18 March 1987) is a British fencer. She has represented Great Britain in both the women's individual and team foil events and in June 2012 she was chosen to represent Great Britain in the 2012 London Olympics. Troiano studied at Christ Church, Oxford.

References

1987 births
Living people
British female foil fencers
Fencers at the 2012 Summer Olympics
Olympic fencers of Great Britain
Sportspeople from London
Alumni of Christ Church, Oxford